The cuisine of Wisconsin is a type of Midwestern cuisine found throughout the state of Wisconsin in the United States of America. Known as "America's Dairyland", Wisconsin is famous for its cheese as well as other dairy products, such as cheese curds and frozen custard. Other notable foods common to the region include bratwursts, beer and Old Fashioned cocktails, butter burgers, fish fries and fish boils, cranberries, and booyah stew.

Dairy

Cheese and cheese products

The state is  well known as a home to many cheesemakers. Currently, Wisconsin has 58 Master Cheesemakers, who are all qualified through an extensive process set by the Wisconsin Milk Marketing Board. The program is the only one of its kind outside of Europe.  Wisconsin cheesemaking is diverse, ranging from artisans who hand-craft their product from the milk of their own dairy herds to large factories.

Colby cheese was first created in Wisconsin in 1885 (named after the town it came from), and Brick cheese was first created in the state in 1877. The state has also played origin to Blue Marble Jack cheese, and is the only producer of Limburger cheese in the United States.

Cheese curds can be eaten separately "squeaky," or cold, as a snack, or covered in batter and fried as an appetizer, often served with ranch dressing as a dipping sauce.

Hot and spicy cheese bread is a popular type of bread created and sold in Madison, Wisconsin from Stella's Bakery.

Ice cream and frozen custard
Wisconsin is one of the Midwestern states that commonly sells blue moon ice cream. The flavor is described to be similar to Froot Loops. While the flavor's origins are not well documented, it was most likely developed by flavor chemist Bill "Doc" Sidon of Milwaukee.

At the University of Wisconsin–Madison, Babcock Dairy Plant and Store produces and sells ice cream, milk, and cheese products on campus. Babcock ice cream uses beef gelatin as its stabilizing agent, making the majority of its flavors non-vegetarian.

Scratch Ice Cream is a small-batch brand of ice cream founded in Milwaukee. Scratch Ice Cream can also be found in Madison, Wisconsin and Chicago, Illinois.

Wisconsin is home to numerous frozen custard stands, particularly around Milwaukee, Wisconsin and along the Lake Michigan corridor. Frozen custard is a dessert similar to ice cream that is also made with eggs.

Alcohol

Beer

Besides its "cheesehead" status, Wisconsin has a reputation for alcohol consumption. Common traits of "drinking culture" are embedded in Wisconsin traditions, from festivals and holidays to everyday life. Many large breweries were founded in Wisconsin, largely in Milwaukee, which gained the epithet "Brew City" before the turn of the century. Miller Brewing Company, Pabst Brewing Company, Joseph Schlitz Brewing Company (all from and originally based in Milwaukee) and Jacob Leinenkugel Brewing Company all began as local businesses before entering the national and international markets. 

Wisconsin has experienced a resurgence in this industry, however, with numerous microbreweries and craft beers now being created and exported. Several other favorites include Ale Asylum, Capital, Sprecher, and New Glarus, the latter being well known for the Spotted Cow Farmhouse Ale.

Cooking with beer is also common across the state. Wisconsinites boil or braise their sausages (especially bratwursts) in several types of beer (most often a Pilsner) with butter and onions, and beer batter fish, typically walleye or perch. Beer-battered cheese curds and onion rings are also typical fare. 

Beer cheese soup is usually made from a variety of beer and a sharp cheddar or more mild colby cheese, with sausage, potatoes, and green onions. 

Another recipe involving alcohol is "beer butt" or "beer can" chicken (similar to drunken chicken), a vernacular meal involving a whole chicken slow-roasted, typically over a fire, with a can of usually amber beer directly inserted into the poultry's cavity.

Other
Besides beer, Wisconsinites also drink large quantities of brandy, often mixed into the unique Badger libation, the "brandy Old Fashioned," which can be sweet, sour, or press. Another though considerably more recent brandy-based cocktail is the Wisconsin Badger, derived from a mix of brandy, cranberry juice, and cherry schnapps.

Pewaukee, Wisconsin is also home to the alcoholic beverage RumChata, described as an horchata recipe containing the primary ingredients of rum and Wisconsin cream.

Bratwurst and sausage
Wisconsin cuisine also features a large amount of sausage, or wurst (German for "sausage"). The state is also a major producer and consumer of summer sausage, as well as the nation's top producer and consumer of brats.

Brats are typically boiled in a mix of beer, butter, and onions, served on a bratwurst bun, and topped with sauerkraut and often a spicy, brown-style mustard. The city of Madison, Wisconsin, the state's capital, plays host to the annual "World's Largest" Brat Fest, a four-day-long festival incorporating music, recreational activities, and bratwursts grilled on a 65-foot-long grill. 

The American Family Field in Milwaukee has the Sausage Race, a mascot race involving racing sausage mascots representative of some of the most common sausages found in the state: bratwurst, kielbasa, Italian sausage, the hot dog, and chorizo. Venison sausage, Andouille sausage, and Belgian trippe (pork and cabbage sausage) are a few other common sausages found in the state, though they do not constitute a part of the Sausage Race. American Family Field is also notable for being the only U.S. stadium in which brats outsell hot dogs.

Booyah

Booyah is another common Wisconsin meal, found especially in the Northeast region of the state. The origins of this dish are disputed, but the Wisconsin origin contends that the word is a vernacular Flemish or Walloon Belgian spelling of the French word bouillon, in this context meaning "broth." Recipes vary but common ingredients usually involve chicken or other meats—beef, pork, or ox tail are most often used—as well as a mirepoix of vegetables, commonly onion, celery, carrots, cabbage, peas, potatoes, and rutabaga. The ingredients are all cooked together in a special kind of large, cast-iron kettle often known as a "booyah kettle," over low heat for several days.

Fish fry and fish boil
The Friday night fish fry, often battered and fried perch or walleye, is traditional throughout Wisconsin, while in northeast Wisconsin along Lake Michigan and the Door County the fish boil is more popular. The supper club is another common phenomenon of Wisconsin culinary heritage and often a destination for fish frys, which usually feature a portion of aforementioned fish, along with various sides: a fried food such as french fries and onion rings are common, along with condiments of tartar sauce and cole slaw (especially crimson slaw, a variety of cole slaw that incorporates Wisconsin's cranberries) and garnishes of parsley and lemon wedges.

Dessert

A popular Wisconsin dessert is the cream puff, a type of profiterole that is a famous treat at the Wisconsin State Fair.

The southeastern Wisconsin city of Racine is known for its Danish kringle, a sweet flaky pastry often served as a dessert. The recipe was brought by Danish immigrants to the region in the 1800s. The kringle became the official state pastry of Wisconsin on June 30, 2013.

Chef Carson Gulley created a fudge-bottom pie recipe at the University of Wisconsin–Madison that is still sold on campus.

Simply Cinnamon Bakery in Pewaukee, Wisconsin is known for their cinnamon rolls.

Other

Seymour, Wisconsin, claims to be the birthplace of the modern hamburger, although several other locations make similar claims. The butter burger originated in Wisconsin, most likely in Solly's Grille in Milwaukee. Butter burgers are hamburgers with butter spread on the buns.

Culver's is a midwestern fast casual food restaurant chain originally from Sauk City, Wisconsin and currently headquartered in Prairie du Sac, Wisconsin. Culver's is known for serving butter burgers, fried cheese curds, and frozen custard.

Dane County Farmers' Market in Madison is the largest producers-only farmer's market in the nation.

La Croix Sparkling Water originates from La Crosse, Wisconsin.

Wild rice grows in Wisconsin, and is an important staple especially for Native American tribes such as the Menominee.

Wisconsin is the country's leading producer of cranberries, which is also the state's official fruit.

Cannibal sandwiches–a type of open-faced sandwich made with rye bread, raw beef, and raw onion–are commonly eaten during the winter season in and around Milwaukee.

See also

 Cuisine of the Midwestern United States
 Door County, Wisconsin § Food

References

 
Wisconsin culture
American cuisine by state